Events from the year 1588 in art.

Events
 Opificio delle pietre dure established in Florence.
 Cornelis van Haarlem starts working on The Fall of the Titans

Paintings

 Annibale Carracci – approximate date
 Landscape with a Fishing Scene (Musée du Louvre)
 Venus with a Satyr and Cupids (Uffizi)
 Hendrik Goltzius – The Four Disgracers (engravings)
 George Gower – Armada Portrait of Elizabeth I of England
 Cornelis van Haarlem - Baptism of Christ
 Nicholas Hilliard – Young Man Among Roses
 Kaspar Memberger the Elder – Building of the Ark
 Hans von Aachen – The Judgement of Paris (approximate date)

Births
January 10 – Nicolaes Eliaszoon Pickenoy, Dutch painter of Flemish origin (died 1653/1656)
January 20 – Francesco Gessi, Italian painter of frescoes (died 1649)
September 10 (bapt.) – Nicholas Lanier, English composer, singer, lutenist, painter and art collector (died 1666)
date unknown
Claude Deruet, French Baroque painter (died 1660)
Giuseppe Badaracco, Italian painter of the Baroque period (died 1657)
Marco Antonio Bassetti, Italian painter (died 1630)
Ilario Casolano, Italian painter of the Baroque period (died 1661)
Hendrick ter Brugghen, Dutch painter, and a leading member of the Dutch followers of Caravaggio (died 1629)
Jan Sadeler II, Flemish engraver of the Sadeler family (died 1665)
Cristóbal Vela, Spanish Baroque painter and gilder (died 1654)

Deaths
March 9 – Pomponio Amalteo, Italian painter of the Venetian school (born 1505)
April 19 – Paolo Veronese, Italian painter of the Renaissance in Venice (born 1528)
August 8 – Alonso Sánchez Coello, portrait painter of the Spanish Renaissance (born 1531/1532)
date unknown 
Marco Marchetti, Italian painter (born 1528)
Jacques le Moyne de Morgues, French artist and member of Jean Ribault's expedition to the New World (born 1533)
Plautilla Nelli, Florentine religious painter and nun (born 1524)
Jacopo Strada, Italian painter, architect, goldsmith, inventor of machines, numismatist, linguist, collector and merchant of works of art (born 1507)

 
Years of the 16th century in art